Charles Stocker Fontelieu (May 5, 1923 – December 14, 2009) was an American actor.

Career
He was a great force in the local theatre in New Orleans for over 60 years being the executive director of Le Petit Theatre du Vieux Carre from 1961 to 1985.  A biography on his half-century career, "Just Who is Stocker Fontelieu?" by Michael P. Cahill, was published in 2007. 

He appeared in several feature and TV films. Among them were Angel Heart, Obsession, Live and Let Die, The Toy and Big Momma's House 2 and Mandingo. Fontelieu died in a nursing home after complications from a fall. He died on December 14, 2009.

Filmography

External links

https://web.archive.org/web/20091219083035/http://www.wwltv.com/news/New-Orleans-theater-legend-Stocker-Fontelieu-dead-at-86-79238642.html
 "Just Who is Stocker Fontelieu?" book by Michael P. Cahill 

1923 births
2009 deaths
American male film actors
American male stage actors
Accidental deaths from falls
Male actors from New Orleans